The following is a list of The Citadel football seasons. The Citadel, The Military College of South Carolina is a member of the Southern Conference of the NCAA Division I.  The Citadel did not sponsor football during the 1943, 1944, and 1945 seasons.  The Citadel has won four Southern Conference Championships, played in and won one bowl game, and participated in the FCS Playoffs five times, with a record of 2–5 through the 2018 Playoffs.

References

Citadel
Citadel Bulldogs football seasons